Nordic Society for Invention and Discovery is a Scandinavian invention lab, founded in 2013 by Per Cromwell and Tomas Mazetti.

Notable work

No More Woof
No More Woof is a device to translate dogs' thoughts into human language using electroencephalography sensors.

The Aalto Puck
The Aalto puck is an experimental hockey puck inspired by the forms of the Finnish architect Alvar Aalto to research what happens if the hockey puck isn't round. It is designed with the goal to maximize randomness and has been tested by hockey teams as Swedish Hammarby IF.

Flying Carpets for Pets
The levitation is provided by six pairs of neodymium magnets.

References

External links
Nordic Society for Invention and Discoverys webpage

2013 establishments in Sweden
Nordic organizations